Bogda (until 1899 Bogdarigós) is a commune in Timiș County, Romania. It is composed of six villages: Altringen, Bogda (commune seat), Buzad, Charlottenburg, Comeat and Sintar.

History 
The first recorded mention dates from 1436, under the name Bagd. Medieval documents record two villages, Felse Baagd and Alsö Baagd ("Upper Bogda" and "Lower Bogda"), which will later merge, so that in 1476 only Bagd is mentioned.

Until 1718, Bogda is administered by the Turks. Austro-Hungarians expelled the Turks and established their own administration here after 1718; native population was deprived of land, being employed on Hungarian counts' estates. The basic activities were timber exploitation, animal husbandry and cereal farming. On the Austrian maps of 1723 and 1761, it appears under the name Bogdan. Between 1770 and 1771, the entire area was included in the second large colonization with German population initiated by Queen Maria Theresa and her son Joseph II. Bogda received the name Neuhof. Sintar was called Buchberg (after Chancellor Eduard Buchberg), and Comeat was Lichtenwald (the Germans left the village in 1782). Charlottenburg, the only Rundling in Banat, was founded by 32 families from Trento, Lorraine and Baden-Württemberg. The existence of these villages is mainly due to Count Karl Ignaz Clay-Aldringen, appointed in 1769 president of the Banat administration. This is how one the villages will be called Altringen. Charlottenburg is named after Aldringen's wife. In fact, the two are the only localities whose names have not been Romanianized. In the 19th century, the owners of Bogda were Ede Altmann, then Ioan Steiner and Anton Negele. At the insistence of the latter, the Hungarian Interior Ministry change its name to Bogdarigós. 

Between the two world wars, Buzad was incorporated into the commune, which until 1926 was under the administration of the commune of Hodoș. During this period, Bogda was a mixed Romanian-German village. It had a choir, a fanfare and a credit union. After World War II, the German community disintegrated, many emigrated, so that by the early 1990s there were no Germans left in Bogda. Overall, it has experienced a continuous decline, with a short period of prosperity caused by the industrialization of agriculture, but against the background of a continuous depopulation. Through the systematization policy of the communist regime, the commune of Bogda was abolished in May 1989 and passed into the administration of the commune of Mașloc. It was re-established in January 1990. The communists planned the demolition of the villages in order to build farms here, but this did not happen. Most of the abandoned houses were bought by the people of Timișoara, being transformed into holiday homes or guest houses.

Demographics 

Bogda had a population of 460 inhabitants at the 2011 census, down 2% from the 2002 census. Most inhabitants are Romanians (91.96%), with a minority of Ukrainians (2.17%). For 3.91% of the population, ethnicity is unknown. By religion, most inhabitants are Orthodox (91.96%), with a minority of Roman Catholics (1.3%). For 4.13% of the population, religious affiliation is unknown.

References 

Communes in Timiș County
Localities in Romanian Banat
Former Danube Swabian communities in Romania